Bulun may refer to:

Bulun (river), a river in Magadan Oblast, Russia
Bulun, Tattinsky District, Sakha Republic, a rural locality in Aldansky Rural Okrug, Tattinsky District, Sakha Republic, Russia 
Bulun, Amginsky District, Sakha Republic, a rural locality in Maysky Rural Okrug, Amginsky District, Sakha Republic, Russia

See also
Bulunsky District, an administrative and municipal district in the Sakha Republic